AGLA is a magic word that appears in some charms. Its meaning is unsettled, but is widely repeated to be a noṭariqōn (kabbalistic acronym) for  ʾAtā gībōr ləʿōlām ʾĂḏōnāy, "Thou, O Lord, art mighty forever." It is said daily in the Gevurot, the second blessing of the Amidah, the central Jewish prayer. According to Katelyn Mesler however, "after much searching, I have yet to find evidence of such an interpretation prior to the late fourteenth or fifteenth century, a couple centuries after AGLA begins appearing in magical writings."

AGLA is found in at least 31 runic inscriptions. During the Middle Ages, the word was reinterpreted in Germany as an initialism for Allmächtiger Gott, Lösche Aus, "Almighty God, extinguish the conflagration" and used as a talisman against fire. It has been inscribed on several Medieval silver crosses from England recorded by the Portable Antiquities Scheme where it was interpreted as a charm against fever.

References

Alchemical symbols
Acronyms
Names of God in Judaism
Magic words